Veronika Hoferková is a former Czech football midfielder, who played for BK Kenty in Sweden's Division 1. She previously played for 1. FC Slovácko in the Czech First Division.

She was a member of the Czech national team.

References

1982 births
Living people
People from Uherské Hradiště
Czech women's footballers
Czech Republic women's international footballers
Czech expatriate women's footballers
1. FC Slovácko (women) players
Expatriate women's footballers in Sweden
Women's association football midfielders
Czech Women's First League players
Sportspeople from the Zlín Region
Czech expatriate sportspeople in Sweden